Plutonium carbide comes in several stoichiometries (PuC and Pu2C3).
It can be used as a nuclear fuel for nuclear reactors in conjunction with uranium carbide. The mixture is also labeled as uranium-plutonium carbide (UPuC).

References

Carbides
Plutonium compounds
Rock salt crystal structure